Yuriy Platonov may refer to:

 Yuriy Platonov (psychologist) (born 1945), a Russian psychologist, rector of St. Petersburg State Institute of Psychology and Social Work.
 Yuriy Platonov (politician) (born 1948), the mayor of Rîbnița.